Antti Ilmari Hakala (born 1978), professionally known as Nopsajalka, is a Finnish musician and producer. Aside from his solo career, he has been a member of the bands Elokuu,  and Kapteeni Ä-ni. To date, Nopsajalka has released five studio albums.

Selected discography

Solo albums

Solo singles

Featured in

References

1978 births
Living people
Finnish male musicians